Oh Se-Lim was an early Korean hapkido practitioner and a pioneer of the art. He had been the president of the Korea Hapkido Federation for 18 years.

Life 
Oh began his study of hapkido at Ji Han-Jae's first hapki yukwonsool school, the An Moo Kwan in Andong, Gyeongsangbuk-do. Fellow students were Kwon Tae-Man, and Yoo Young-Woo.

He continued training at Majang, Seongdong, Seoul in 1957. Oh joined other senior practitioners already training in Seoul at that time, early hapkido practitioners Hwang Deok-Kyoo (latter day president of the Korea Hapkido Association), Myung Kwang Sik (latter day founder of the World Hapkido Federation), Lee Tae Jun, Kim Yong-Jin (founder of the Ulji Kwan), Kang Jong-Soo, and Kim Yong-Whan.

Accomplishments 
Oh Se-Lim was elected the president of the Korea Hapkido Association in 1980. By 1983 Oh Se-Lim, with political problems and many of the original founding members of the Korea Hapkido Association departing (Ji Han-Jae, Myung Jae-Nam), renamed the association by the name first used by the organization he had first been a part of with Master Ji, the Dae Han Hapkido Hyub Hoe, with a new preferred English rendering; the Korea Hapkido Federation (KHF). Master Oh resigned the position of the president of the KHF, that was succeeded by Kim Jong-Yoon in 2008.

See also 
 Korean martial arts
 Hapkido
 List of people of Korean descent

References 

 Kim, He-Young. Hapkido II. Andrew Jackson Press, Baton Rouge, Louisiana 1994.

External links 
 Korea Hapkido Federation
 Korea Hapkido Federation USA

Martial arts school founders
South Korean hapkido practitioners
Living people
Year of birth missing (living people)